Planet Half-Life (often abbreviated to PHL) is a gaming website owned by IGN and its subsidiary GameSpy. Maintained by a voluntary team of contributors, the site is dedicated to providing news and information about Half-Life and Half-Life 2, related modifications and other Valve titles. It was founded by Kevin "Fragmaster" Bowen and was at one point the largest of an array of GameSpy-run gaming websites known as the Planet Network. Following GameSpy's closure,  the Planet Half-Life website still remains accessible, but seems to have ceased updating.

Content
Planet Half-Life's content consisted mainly of a news wire on its front page. Stories on updates, patches, press releases and events related to Half-Life and just about anything else concerning Valve are posted on an almost daily basis. These stories are also mirrored in the site's forum for reader comments.

In addition to the news, Planet Half-Life hosts extensive, in-depth collections of information regarding Half-Life, Half-Life 2 (along with Portal), Counter-Strike, Team Fortress and Day of Defeat. These sections cover overviews of each game as well as any official expansion packs related to them, as well as going over their storylines, important characters, enemies, weapons, cheats, walkthroughs, and, in the case of the multiplayer games, map overviews and strategies. The information found on these pages is original work drafted by the staff writers and senior editors collectively (although without any individual credits given, unlike other articles found on the site).

Other services

Forum
A major feature of Planet Half-Life, and all other planet sites, is its public forum. These forums include boards ranging from general discussion to technical help.

In August 2007, the forums changed format to comply with GameSpy's ForumPlanet standard (the IGN SnowBoards system), removing some outdated features and adding many new ones, such as a dynamic news box that streams in late-breaking news from not only PHL, but all other planet sites as well. This also changed the registration process for the forum, from a per-planet account basis to a network-wide, global account basis. At this time Planet Half-Life's sister sites Planet Fortress and CS.net were officially unsupported and their forums were to be merged into PHL's, although this process lasted over a year before it was complete.

Game servers
Planet Half-Life has been running public game servers since 2006, hosting 24/7 map rotations for Counter-Strike 1.6, Counter-Strike: Source, Day of Defeat: Source, Half-Life: Deathmatch, Half-Life 2: Deathmatch and Team Fortress 2. However, currently only the Half-life 2: Deathmatch and Day of Defeat: Source servers are consistently online and even they rarely see much use. The PHL servers are maintained by WOLFServers.com.

Steam Community
In addition to public servers, Planet Half-Life also has a Steam Community group. Steam Communities are in early stages of development. The PHL Community can only host a chat room and specialized news updates for now, but more features will be added in the future based on suggestions from readers.

PHLWiki
In June 2006, Planet Half-Life began its own wiki project. To date, the PHLWiki contains over a hundred articles dealing with fictional Half-Life characters, creatures and locations in an in-universe, encyclopedic form as well as real life articles on mods, player terminology and strategy guides. The in-universe and real life articles are kept separately, although they can be linked to each other. Before being announced publicly, most of the existing pages, particularly articles making up the fictional encyclopedia, were written by PHL staff writers. The PHLWiki is open to public viewing and editing.

Site hosting
Planet Half-Life also offers free web hosting for Half-Life themed websites. The web hosting is regulated through GameSpy, though the address of hosted sites is a subset of the Planet Half-Life domain. This was a major attraction of the site in its early days and many original Half-Life mod teams took advantage of the offer. However this feature has not been utilized nearly as much since the release of Half-Life 2. A directory of the old sites still exists, although most have been abandoned by their creators.

History
Planet Half-Life has been running since April 27, 1999. Since then, it has undergone numerous format changes, both in content and aesthetic. The following is a timeline of major changes and other events.
April 27, 1999, A small fan site known as contaminated.net is relaunched as "Planet Half-Life", covering Half-Life and editing resources. It looks nothing like it does today.
November 16, 1999, Major changes to layout and color scheme, plus new sections covering Half-Life: Opposing Force and the announcement of Half-Life 2.
December 3, 2000, New sections covering Counter-Strike and Team Fortress Classic, these and other game overview sections consolidated into buttons at the top of left-side navigation bar as well as large buttons on the top of the front page, Half-Life 2 section is buried.
June 19, 2001, New section covering Half-Life: Blue Shift.
September 14, 2002, New section covering Day of Defeat.
May 24, 2003, Half-Life 2 section re-opens amid rumors of a September 2003 launch and early media releases.
July 17, 2003, Major changes to color scheme and graphics in anticipation of Half-Life 2 launch.
June 11, 2006, PHLWiki is launched, with bulk of content made up by staff writers prior to public unveiling.
September 13, 2006, Complete site format change to accommodate new PNAP article submission system, as well as new color scheme and graphics that are still in use today.
September 13, 2007, PHL Steam Community officially announced to the public.

References

External links
Planet Half-Life
Planet Half-Life Forums

Half-Life (series)
Video game news websites
GameSpy
Internet properties established in 1999